The  is a bay located north of the island of Honshu, in Japan. It is considered to be part of the larger Mutsu Bay.

Geography
Aomori Bay is an inner bay located to the west of Natsudomari Peninsula that protrudes in the center of the southern coast of Mutsu Bay. The bay is bordered by the Tsugaru Peninsula to the west and the harbor of Aomori to the south.

Animal and plant life
Emplectonema kandai is a bioluminescent marine ribbon worm found in Aomori Bay at a depth of 35–40 meters, and coiled up on Chelyosoma sea squirts.

Human history
The bay provided resources for the Jōmon people living at the settlements along its coastline, such as the Sannai-Maruyama Site.

References

Bays of Japan
Tourist attractions in Aomori Prefecture
Landforms of Aomori Prefecture
Hiranai, Aomori
Aomori (city)
Yomogita, Aomori